Chrome was one of ten electronic/dance commercial-free satellite radio channels operated by Sirius XM Radio on channel 83 (and since November 2005 on DirecTV 861), and was one of five dance music channels offered by XM. The channel played classic disco and dance music from the 1970s through the 1980s and freestyle music which was popular from the mid-1980s to early 1990s.  On November 12, 2008, the channel was eliminated from the XM lineup with the XM/Sirius merger, and no equivalent music was made available.

Chrome was one of the first channels offered by XM Satellite Radio at launch; the first song played was "Get Down Tonight" by KC & the Sunshine Band. The last song played was Donna Summer's "Last Dance". Among its jingling promos was "Where Disco DOESN'T Suck".

During November and December 2004, the channel was pre-empted for Special Xmas on the satellite service.

Sirius/XM announced on December 16, 2008 that the format hole will filled by The Strobe (a channel that was heard exclusively on Sirius before its removal on November 12, 2008), the name of the disco/classic dance channel, effective January 15, 2009.

References

See also
XM Satellite Radio channel history

Defunct radio stations in the United States
XM Satellite Radio channels
Radio stations established in 2001
Radio stations disestablished in 2008
Dance radio stations